"The Sweetest Thing" is a song co-written and recorded by American country music artist Carlene Carter.  It was released in March 1991 as the third single from the album I Fell in Love.  The song reached number 25 on the Billboard Hot Country Singles & Tracks chart.  It was written by Carter and Robert Ellis Orrall.

Chart performance

Year-end charts

References

1991 singles
1991 songs
Carlene Carter songs
Songs written by Carlene Carter
Songs written by Robert Ellis Orrall
Song recordings produced by Howie Epstein
Reprise Records singles